Diomedes Soter or Diodotus (epithet means "the Saviour") was an Indo-Greek king and possible claimant Greco-Bactrian King who may have attempted to reconquer the lands north of the Hindu Kush. The places where his coins have been found seem to indicate that his rule was based in the area of the Paropamisadae, possibly with temporary dominions further east. Judging from their similar portraits and many overlapping monograms, the young Diomedes seems to have been the heir (and probably a relative) of Philoxenus, the last king to rule before the kingdom of Menander I finally fragmented.

Time of reign
Bopearachchi dates Diomedes to c. 95–90 BCE and R. C. Senior dates him to c. 115–105 BCE.

Coins of Diomedes (Diodotus)
Diomedes either born Diodotus or reigning as such; perhaps erroneously labelled on legend as Diomedes, is depicted with the Dioscuri on his coins, either on horseback or standing; both types were previously used by Eucratides the Great, which strongly suggests a likt to the Diodotid dynasty,and further supports the subject of his mistaken name. It is however uncertain how the two were related, since Eucratides I died long before Diomedes.

Diomedes minted both Attic-type coins (Greco-Bactrian style, with Greek legend only), and bilingual coins (with Greek and Kharoshthi), indicating that he was ruling in the western part of the Indo-Greek territory.

One overstrike is known, of a coin of Strato and Agathokleia over a coin of Diomedes. This overstrike could indicate that Diomedes fought over the central areas of the Indo-Greek territories with Strato and Agathokleia.

See also
Greco-Bactrian Kingdom
Greco-Buddhism
Indo-Parthian Kingdom
Indo-Scythians
Kushan Empire
Seleucid Empire

References

External links
Coins of Diomedes
Other coins of Diomedes
  Le roi Diomède 

Indo-Greek kings
1st-century BC rulers in Asia
Diodotid dynasty